Gilbert Vassart is a Belgian scientist and professor at the Universite Libre de Bruxelles. His research interests include molecular endocrinology, especially related to the thyroid, and pharmacology of G protein-coupled receptor along with medical genetics.

He is the past director of the Institut de Recherche Interdisciplinaire en Biologie humaine et moléculaire (IRIBHM) and teaches Medical Genetics at the Medical School of the Université Libre de Bruxelles.

Honors and awards

 Docteur honoris causa of the University of Chicago (2002)
 Docteur honoris causa of the Université René Descartes (2000)
 Francqui Prize (1993)
 Van Geysel European award for biomedical research (2000)
 ISI Highly Cited Scientist in Biology & Biochemistry

References

External links
 Gilbert Vassart (ULB)

Belgian endocrinologists
Academic staff of the Université libre de Bruxelles
Living people
Year of birth missing (living people)